The Paraguay national handball team is the team that represents Paraguay in the international handball competitions organized by the Pan-American Team Handball Federation (PATHF), the International Handball Federation (IHF) and the International Olympic Committee (IOC), and is governed by the Federación Paraguaya de Handball. Paraguay participated in 5 Pan American Men's Handball Championships in 1981, 1994, 2002, 2012 and 2016.

Tournament record

Pan American Championship

Pan American Games
1995 – 5th

South and Central American Championship

South American Games

IHF South and Central American Emerging Nations Championship

Junior team

World Junior Championship

Pan American Junior Championship

References

External links
IHF profile

Handball
Men's national handball teams